The Honourable Sir John William Fortescue  (28 December 1859 – 22 October 1933) was a British military historian. He was a historian of the British Army and served as Royal Librarian and Archivist at Windsor Castle from 1905 until 1926.

Early life
Fortescue was born on 28 December 1859 in Madeira, the 5th son of Hugh, 3rd Earl Fortescue, by his wife Georgina, Countess Fortescue (née Dawson-Damer). His family owned much of the area around Simonsbath on Exmoor since the twelfth century, thus he joined the North Devon Yeomanry Cavalry latterly serving as a major.

Fortescue was educated at Harrow School and Trinity College, Cambridge, later lecturing at Oxford (DLitt (Oxon)).

Career
Fortescue is best known for his major work on the history of the British Army, which he wrote between 1899 and 1930. Between 1905 and 1926 he worked as the Royal Librarian at Windsor Castle.

In 1911, Fortescue delivered the Ford Lectures at Oxford University. In 1920 he delivered the British Academy's Raleigh Lecture on History. He served as president of the Royal Historical Society from 1921 to 1925 and was elected an Honorary Fellow of Trinity College, Cambridge.

He received the King George V Version of the Royal Household Long and Faithful Service Medal in 1925 for 20 years service to the British Royal Family.
Fortescue was appointed KCVO in the 1926 King's Birthday Honours List.

Personal life
In 1914 Fortescue married Winifred Beech, daughter of the Revd Howard Beech, Rector of Great Bealings, Suffolk; they had no children. Lady Fortescue (who died in 1951) was a writer and actress.  He died in Cannes on 22 October 1933 at the age of 73.

Works
 
 
 1897 The Story of a Red Deer
 
 1899–1930 A History of the British Army (in thirteen volumes, taking the story up to 1870) Available online for downloading
 
 
 
 
 
 
 
 
 
 1930–1932 Royal Army Service Corps: A History of Transport and Supply in the British Army

See also 
 Earl Fortescue

References

External links

 Biography from a site about his wife, Lady Fortescue
 
 

1859 births
1933 deaths
Younger sons of earls
John
People educated at Harrow School
Alumni of Trinity College, Cambridge
People associated with the University of Oxford
Knights Commander of the Royal Victorian Order
Fellows of the Royal Historical Society
Presidents of the Royal Historical Society
Royal Librarians